Jason Jon Jiménez (born January 10, 1976) is a former Major League Baseball pitcher. Jimenez, who is of Mexican descent, made his Major League Baseball debut on June 3, 2002. He pitched in five games for the Tampa Bay Devil Rays and one game for the Detroit Tigers.

References

External links

1976 births
Living people
Baseball players from California
Major League Baseball pitchers
American baseball players of Mexican descent
Detroit Tigers players
Tampa Bay Devil Rays players
Durham Bulls players
Hudson Valley Renegades players
Orlando Rays players
Reading Phillies players
Scranton/Wilkes-Barre Red Barons players
St. Petersburg Devil Rays players
Toledo Mud Hens players
San Jose State Spartans baseball players